Gabriella Charlotte Page (born October 29, 1994) is a Canadian fencer.

Biography
In 2015, she won one of the bronze medals in the women's sabre event at the Pan American Games held in Toronto, Canada. She also won a bronze medal in the same event at the 2019 Pan American Games held in Lima, Peru.

She also competed at the Pan American Fencing Championships where she won a bronze medal in the individual sabre event in 2019; bronze medals in the team sabre event in 2012, 2013 and 2016; and competed in 2014, 2015 and 2018.

Page represented Canada at the 2020 Summer Olympics in Tokyo, Japan. She competed in the women's sabre event.

She won the silver medal in both the women's individual and team sabre events at the 2022 Pan American Fencing Championships held in Asunción, Paraguay.

References

External links 
 

1994 births
Living people
Canadian female sabre fencers
Fencers from Montreal
Pan American Games medalists in fencing
Pan American Games silver medalists for Canada
Pan American Games bronze medalists for Canada
Fencers at the 2015 Pan American Games
Fencers at the 2019 Pan American Games
Medalists at the 2015 Pan American Games
Medalists at the 2019 Pan American Games
Fencers at the 2020 Summer Olympics
Olympic fencers of Canada
21st-century Canadian women